Albania competed at the 2014 Winter Olympics in Sochi, Russia from 7 to 23 February 2014. The team consisted of two athletes competing in alpine skiing and for the first time a female athlete.

Competitors

Alpine skiing 

According to the final quota allocation released on January 20, 2014, Albania had two athletes in qualification position. Erjon Tola was scheduled to compete in his third consecutive games, but had to withdraw because he broke his arm in training.

On February 18, Suela Mëhilli finished the giant slalom race in 60th position (out of 74 competitors who finished). She did not finish the slalom race after starting the first run.

References

External links 
 
 

Nations at the 2014 Winter Olympics
2014
2014 in Albanian sport